Charles Munch may refer to:

Charles Munch (painter) (born 1945), American artist
Charles Munch (conductor) (1891–1968), orchestral conductor
 Charles Munch discography